The Abraham Accords are a series of joint normalization statements initially between Israel, the United Arab Emirates, and Bahrain, effective since September 15, 2020. Mediated by the United States, the initial announcement of August 13, 2020, concerned only Israel and the United Arab Emirates before the announcement of a follow-up agreement between Israel and Bahrain on September 11, 2020. On September 15, 2020, the official signing ceremony for the Abraham Accords was hosted by the United States at the White House. As part of the dual agreements, both the United Arab Emirates and Bahrain recognized Israel's sovereignty, enabling the establishment of full diplomatic relations.

Israel's establishment of diplomatic relations with the United Arab Emirates and Bahrain marked the first instance of Arab–Israeli normalization since 1994, when the Israel–Jordan peace treaty came into effect. The Abraham Accords were signed by Bahraini foreign minister Abdullatif bin Rashid Al-Zayani and Emirati foreign minister Abdullah bin Zayed Al-Nahyan vis-à-vis Israeli Prime Minister Benjamin Netanyahu, with American president Donald Trump as witness. They were negotiated by Trump's son-in-law and senior advisor Jared Kushner and Kushner's assistant Avi Berkowitz.

The official document titles of the separate agreements for the United Arab Emirates and Bahrain were, respectively: Abraham Accords Peace Agreement: Treaty of Peace, Diplomatic Relations and Full Normalization Between the United Arab Emirates and the State of Israel and Abraham Accords: Declaration of Peace, Cooperation, and Constructive Diplomatic and Friendly Relations. The name of the Abraham Accords is rooted in the common belief of the Abrahamic religions—particularly Judaism, Christianity, and Islam—regarding the role of Abraham as a patriarch.

In December 2020, Morocco joined the accords and normalized relations with Israel after the Trump administration recognized Moroccan control over the disputed Western Sahara region. In January 2021, Sudan joined the Abraham Accords and normalized relations with Israel after the Trump administration agreed to remove Sudan from the State Department list of "state sponsors of terrorism" and provide a $1.2 billion loan to help Sudan clear its debts to the World Bank. On January 6, 2021, Sudan officially signed the Abraham Accords Declaration. The signing took place in the Sudanese capital Khartoum, in the presence of US Treasury Secretary Steven Mnuchin. While Sudan signed the declarative section of the agreement, it did not sign the corresponding document with Israel, unlike the United Arab Emirates and Bahrain. As of February 2023, negotiations continue towards normalization. Meanwhile, the ongoing efforts have been condemned by the Sudanese opposition and civil society groups.

Background and negotiations
On January 28, 2020, the Trump administration unveiled its Israeli–Palestinian peace proposal in a ceremony at the White House. A component of the plan envisioned applying Israeli law to, or annexation of, roughly 30% of the West Bank. On June 12, 2020, Emirati ambassador to the U.S. Yousef Al-Otaiba authored an op-ed in an effort to halt Israel's planned annexation of West Bank territory. Otaiba's op-ed was addressed to the Israeli public and published on the front page of Yedioth Ahronoth. The White House had reservations about annexation, as well, which Berkowitz discussed with Netanyahu in meetings in Israel over three days in late June 2020. Berkowitz proposed an alternative to annexation in the meetings: normalization with the United Arab Emirates.

On July 2, 2020, Otaiba met with Berkowitz to further discuss an alternative plan to annexation. Along with a mutual opposition to Iran, the concerns detailed by Otaiba's op-ed and planning with Kushner and Berkowitz helped bring vested parties to the negotiating table to identify an alternative solution that ultimately resulted in a normalization agreement reached in August 2020. As a result of the deal, annexation was postponed. Hours after the August 13 announcement of the U.S.-brokered normalization agreements between Israel and the United Arab Emirates, senior Bahraini officials called President Trump's senior adviser, Jared Kushner, and his assistant, Avi Berkowitz, with a message: "We want to be next.”

Over the next 29 days, Kushner and Berkowitz negotiated with and traveled to Bahrain before closing the deal on September 11, 2020, in a call between Trump, Netanyahu, and the king of Bahrain.
All three countries officially committed to the deals on September 15, 2020, with the signing of the Abraham Accords on the South Lawn of the White House.

On October 23, 2020, Israel and Sudan agreed to normalize ties, making Sudan the third Arab country to set aside hostilities in two months. The agreement was negotiated on the U.S. side by Trump senior adviser Jared Kushner, Middle East envoy Avi Berkowitz, national security adviser Robert O’Brien, Secretary of State Mike Pompeo and national security official Miguel Correa.

On December 10, 2020, President Trump announced that Israel and the Kingdom of Morocco agreed to establish full diplomatic relations. The agreement was negotiated by Trump senior adviser Jared Kushner and Middle East envoy Avi Berkowitz and marked Kushner and Berkowitz's fourth normalization agreement in as many months. As a component of the deal, the United States agreed to recognize Moroccan sovereignty over the Western Sahara.

On March 1, 2021, former US Secretary of State Mike Pompeo credited the 2019 Warsaw Conference with providing the breakthrough that paved the way. A goal of the two-day conference was to focus on countering Iran, although the host nation tried to play down that theme and the closing Polish-US statement did not mention Iran.

Among the representatives of the 70 nations in attendance were a number of Arab officials, creating the first situation since the Madrid Peace Conference in 1991 where an Israeli leader and senior Arab officials were all in attendance at the same international conference focused on the Middle East. The Madrid Conference at the time set the stage for the Oslo Accords. Among those with whom Israeli Prime Minister Benjamin Netanyahu met was the Omani Foreign Minister Yusuf bin Alawi bin Abdullah—whose country he had visited in October 2018. Two days after Netanyahu's visit at the time, bin Alawi suggested while at a conference in Bahrain that it was time for Israel to be treated like the other states in the Middle East, and the officials of Bahrain and Saudi Arabia did not disagree.

Documents

The documents related to the Abraham Accords are as follows:

Aftermath
At the signing, U.S. President Donald Trump said five nations could soon follow, including Saudi Arabia, although analysts believed that Sudan and Oman were more likely candidates in the short term. On September 23, 2020, US Ambassador to the United Nations Kelly Craft said that a new country would recognize Israel "in the next day or two."

On February 2, 2021, State Department spokesperson Ned Price said that "the United States will continue to urge other countries to normalize relations with Israel." and that normalization is "not a substitute for Israeli-Palestinian peace... We hope that Israel and other countries in the region join together in a common effort to build bridges and... contribute to tangible progress towards the goal of advancing a negotiated peace between Israelis and Palestinians."

On 26 March 2021, a group of 18 U.S. senators introduced a bill to aid the State Department in developing appropriate strategy “to strengthen and expand the Abraham Accords and other related normalization agreements with Israel.”

According to The Jewish Press, on 1 April 2021, State Department spokesman Ned Price was asked by a reporter to use the name Abraham Accords, declined to do so and repeatedly preferred to use the term “normalization agreements.” According to Axios reporting on March 10, 2021, "The Biden administration wants to continue a process that began under Trump while securing achievements of its own through new deals," and "is also not enthusiastic about Trump's name for the agreements: the “Abraham Accords.” The White House and State Department prefer to discuss “the normalization process."

A 2021 paper analyzing the UAE-Israel normalization argues that it results from pressures at the domestic and systemic levels, but the dynamics at play in the Middle East regional security complex are ultimately more important factors in explaining normalization.

Sudan

On September 26, 2020, Sudanese Prime Minister Abdalla Hamdok said that Sudan did not want to link its removal from a US terrorism list to normalizing relations with Israel, as asked for by the US.

On October 23, 2020, Sudan formally agreed to normalize ties with Israel and join the broader diplomatic realignment in the Middle East in a deal brokered from the Oval Office by the United States and President Trump. Israel and Sudan leaders originally agreed to move towards normalization after a February 2020 meeting in Uganda and accelerated a deal following normalization announcements between Israel and UAE. Israeli Prime Minister Benjamin Netanyahu stated, "This is a new era. An era of true peace. A peace that is expanding with other Arab countries—three of them in recent weeks". The United States agreed to remove Sudan from the list of State Sponsors of Terrorism, lifting coinciding economic sanctions and agreed to advance discussions on debt forgiveness. Denying any wrongdoing, Sudan agreed to pay 335 million U.S. dollars in compensation to American victims of terror. In a tweet from his official Twitter account, Sudanese Prime Minister Abdulla Hamdok thanked Mr. Trump for signing the executive order removing his country from the list of state sponsors of terrorism but didn't mention the deal with Israel.

In January 2021, Sudan signed the declaration, with the US completing a promise of removing the country from the list of countries supporting terrorism and reaffirming a previous commitment to provide a bridge loan to clear the country's arrears to the World Bank and access $1 billion in annual funding. On April 6, 2021, the Cabinet of Sudan approved legislation repealing a law from 1958 which had prohibited diplomatic and business relations with Israel.

Morocco

In December 2020, Israel and Morocco agreed to normalize their relations in the Israel–Morocco normalization agreement, with the United States recognizing Morocco's claim over Western Sahara. The agreement was later cited by Algeria as one of the reasons for unilaterally cutting relations with Morocco.

On November 24, 2021, the Israeli Minister of Defense, Benny Gantz, signed a joint security understandings agreement with Moroccan defense minister Abdellatif Loudiyi. This is the first time that Israel has signed such an agreement openly with an Arab state. The agreement formalized the defense ties between the two countries, allowing for smoother cooperation between their defense establishments.

Oman
Oman postponed a decision to normalize ties with Israel until after the U.S. presidential election, which happened on November 3, 2020. On February 11, 2021, Foreign Minister Badr al-Busaidi said “As regards Israel we are content so far with the level of our current relations and dialogue, which involves the appropriate channels of communication," adding that Oman was "committed to peace between Israel and the Palestinians based on a two-state solution."

Bahrain
After the signing of Abraham Accords, Bahrain appointed Khaled Yousif Al-Jalahma as the first-ever ambassador from Bahrain to Israel on March 30, 2021.

Jordan
In November 2021, Israel, the United Arab Emirates, and Jordan signed a letter of intent for the export of 600 MW of electricity to Israel annually, produced by solar farms in Jordan that would be built by the UAE-government owned Masdar, while Jordan would receive 200 million cubic meters of desalinated water produced by Israel each year. The program was developed in a series of secret talks since September 2021, and a renewed memorandum of understanding was signed in November 2022.

Others 
As of March 7, Prime Minister Netanyahu and Foreign Minister Eli Cohen are in talks with the Americans to expand the Abraham Accords with Indonesia, Nigeria, Mauritania and Somalia.

Economic impact
While Israel and the UAE had long-maintained de facto recognition in areas of business including the diamond trade, and high tech industries including artificial intelligence and defense, the accord opened the door to a much wider range of economic cooperation, including formal investments. In November 2021, OurCrowd Arabia became the first Israeli venture capital firm to receive a license from the Abu Dhabi Global Market (ADGM), and in November 2022, OurCrowd launched Integrated Data Intelligence Ltd. (IDI), offering artificial intelligence for business, in Abu Dhabi as part of a $60 million joint investment with the Abu Dhabi Investment Office. Together with OurCrowd, in November 2022, fintech company Liquidity Group opened an office as part of a $545 million government incentive program.

A host of Israeli and UAE law enterprises including law firms and healthcare providers announced collaborations. Lishot, an Israeli water quality testing company was among the first Israeli firms making direct deliveries to Dubai. A number of kosher restaurants were opened in the UAE to cater to Jewish visitors. Abu Dhabi Investment Office opened its first overseas branch in Israel. UAE businesses and individuals began acquiring stakes in Israeli assets, such as Beitar Jerusalem football team, Haifa Port Company, and Israir Airlines.

According to Israel's Ministry of Defense, the value of Israeli defense exports to countries with which it normalized relations in 2020 reached $791 million.

Abraham Fund

The Abraham Fund was a program sponsored by the U.S. Government that was supposed to raise $3 billion to boost trade and agriculture in the region, facilitate access to clean water and affordable electricity, and "enable strategic infrastructure projects". The Fund was to be overseen by the U.S. International Development Finance Corporation, and then-CEO Adam Boehler.  Its first projects were reported to be the upgrading of checkpoints between Israel and Palestinian territories and a gas pipeline to be built between the Red Sea and the Mediterranean. Despite numerous visits by Kushner and U.S. Secretary of the Treasury Steven Mnuchin with rulers in the region in the last months of the Trump presidency, the fund never received any money, and no projects were ever begun. Following the transition to the Biden administration and the resignation of the Fund's appointed manager, Aryeh Lightstone, the future of the Fund was thrown into question.

Environmental impact
On 14 August 2021, the Associated Press reported that a secret oil deal between Israel and the United Arab Emirates, struck in 2020 as part of the Abraham Accords, has turned the Israeli resort town of Eilat into a waypoint for Emirati oil headed for Western markets. It was expected to endanger the Red Sea reefs, which host some of the greatest coral diversity on the planet. As Jordan, Egypt and Saudi Arabia also share the gulf's waters, an ecological disaster was likely to impact their ecosystems.

Collaborative efforts
In mid-December 2020, a delegation from the UAE and Bahrain visited Israel, the occupied Golan Heights and Jerusalem with the aim of cultural exchange as part of the normalization process. The delegations held a meeting with Israel President Reuven Rivlin. In January 2021, a collaborative event was organized by Tel Aviv International Salon, Sharaka and OurCrowd with the objective to attain 'business of peace' between the Persian Gulf Countries and the state of Israel.

From March 23–25, 2021, a virtual hackathon event was organized by Israel-is, which garnered  participants from the UAE, Bahrain and Morocco as well as Israel. Then on 27 March 2021, an event was organized to commemorate International Holocaust Memorial Day, which again saw participation from the UAE, Bahrain and Morocco, as well as Saudi Arabia.

March 2021 also saw the Israel and UAE national rugby teams play their first-ever match, in honor of the Abraham Accords. In June 2021, influencers from UAE, Bahrain, Morocco, and Egypt visited Magen David Adom, Israel's ambulance service, focused on Magen David Adom's "lifesaving work and its technological expertise". The visit was filmed for "Finding Abraham", a film that was premiered at the UN on the anniversary of the signing of the Abraham Accords in September 2021.

See also

 Camp David Accords
 Egypt–Israel peace treaty
 Israel–Jordan peace treaty
 Arab states–Israeli alliance against Iran
 Indo-Abrahamic Alliance
 Iran–Israel proxy conflict
 Iran–Saudi Arabia proxy conflict

References 

 
Arab–Israeli peace process
Arab–Israeli alliance against Iran
Iran–Israel proxy conflict
Middle East peace efforts
Presidency of Donald Trump
Benjamin Netanyahu
Foreign relations of Israel
Foreign relations of the United Arab Emirates
Foreign relations of Bahrain
Foreign relations of Sudan
Foreign relations of Morocco
Foreign relations of the United States
Bahrain–Israel relations
Bahrain–United States relations
Israel–Morocco relations
Israel–Sudan relations
Israel–United Arab Emirates relations
Israel–United States relations
Morocco–United States relations
Sudan–United States relations
United Arab Emirates–United States relations